Těmice refers to the following places in the Czech Republic:

Těmice (Hodonín District)
Těmice (Pelhřimov District)